Desmia phaiorrhoea is a moth in the family Crambidae described by Harrison Gray Dyar Jr. in 1914. It is found in Panama.

The wingspan is about 25 mm. The forewings are black with two oval white spots. The hindwings have an inner spot below the cell, nearly to the inner margin and duplicated on the outside by a narrow white line.

References

Moths described in 1914
Desmia
Moths of Central America